John Blair (born 1961) is an American poet, novelist, and short story writer.

Life
He was born in St. Petersburg, Florida.  He graduated from Florida State University, and Tulane University, with a Ph.D.

His work appeared in Poetry, The Southern Review, Antioch Review, American Literature, The Georgia Review,  The Sewanee Review, Shenandoah, Southern Poetry Review, Southern Humanities Review, Studies in the Novel and some three dozen other literary magazines and scholarly journals.

His books include several prize winning volumes, including American Standard, which won the prestigious Drue Heinz Literature Prize, The Green Girls, winner of the Lena Wever-Miles Poetry Award, The Occasions of Paradise, winner of the Tampa Review Prize in Poetry, and Playful Song Called Beautiful Winner of the prestigious Iowa Poetry Prize.

He is a University Distinguished Professor at Texas State University, where he directs the undergraduate creative writing program and teaches American Literature.
He lives in Texas, with his wife and son.

Awards
 2002 Drue Heinz Literature Prize
 2003 Lena-Miles Wever Todd Poetry Prize
 2006 The Andrew Lytle Prize for Fiction
 2007 Phoebe Winter Fiction Award
 2008 Rumi Prize for Poetry
 2010 The St. Petersburg Review Prize in Poetry
 2012 The Tampa Review Prize in Poetry
 2014 The Florida Review Editors' Prize in Poetry'
 2014 The Tusculum Review Prize in Fiction
 2015 The Dana Award in Poetry
 2015 Iowa Poetry Prize 
 2016 Wilda Herne Prize for Fiction
 2017 49th Parallel Award for Poetry
 2017 Cultural Center of Cape Cod's National Prize for Poetry
 2019 Connecticut River Review Poetry Award
 2019 Julia Darling Memorial Poetry Prize
 2019 Prize Americana for Prose
 2020 Briar Cliff Review Poetry Prize
 2021 Edwin Markham Prize in Poetry
 2021 Rash Award in Poetry
 2021 Robert Frost Award in Poetry
 2022 Robinson Jeffers Tor House Prize in Poetry

Works

Poetry

Short Stories

Novels

References

External links
"American Standard", Ralph Magazine
[https://www.poetryfoundation.org/poetrymagazine/browse?contentId=37335 "Winter Storm, New Orleans", Poetry
[https://www.poetryfoundation.org/poetrymagazine/browse?contentId=37334 "Cicada", Poetry
[http://www.versedaily.org/2017/penniesfromheaven.shtml "Pennies from Heaven", Verse Daily
[https://www.reedmag.org/john-blair "Aphorism 33: Life Is a Flame that Burns Itself Out", Reed Magazine
[https://www.newletters.org/inverting-the-elephant-by-john-blair/ "Inverting the Elephant", New Letters
[https://americanliteraryreview.com/2018/12/05/john-blair/ "Blue", American Literary Review
[https://www.thecafereview.com/winter-2015-poets-john-blair/ "John Blair", The Cafe Review
[https://pbqmag.org/tag/john-blair/ "Aubade for Ash Wednesday", Painted Bride Quarterly
[https://lsupress.org/authors/detail/john-blair/ "The Green Girls", LSU Press
[https://faculty.txst.edu/profile/1921974 "Faculty Profile", Texas State University
https://www.torhouse.org/prize "The Box", Robinson Jeffers Tor House Foundation

1961 births
Living people
American male poets
American male short story writers
American male novelists
21st-century American novelists
21st-century American poets
Florida State University alumni
Tulane University alumni
Texas State University faculty
Writers from St. Petersburg, Florida
21st-century American short story writers
21st-century American male writers
Novelists from Texas
Novelists from Florida